Hashim Shah (Punjabi  , ਹਾਸ਼ਿਮ ਸ਼ਾਹ ; b. 1735 d. 1843) was a Punjabi writer and Sufi poet, best known for his story Sassi Punnun (or Sassi Panhu). His family migrated from Holy city Madina to Punjab, India, where they began living at Jagdev Kalan, the biggest village in Ajnala tehsil, Amritsar district. Hashim Shah was born in Jagdev Kalan in 1735 or 1752 and lived in that village his entire life. He wrote three stories "Kissa Kaw" named Sassi Punnu, Sohni Mahiwal, and Shirin Farhad.

Hashim, besides following the family tradition of hikmat (physician), copunselling and Piri-Muridi, also worked as a carpenter for sustenance. He left the profession of carpentry when Maharaja Ranjit Singh and his courtiers extended their patronage to Hashim. Thereafter, he devoted his entire life to spiritual attainments and composing Sufistic (mystic) poetry.

Hashim Shah's poetry is unique in its own right. Credited as one of the best poets of his era many books have been written about him by his followers. His poetry has a certain style reverberating with description and sometimes sadness. The way he has narrated Sassi Punnu speaks for the depth in his words and the immense aptitude he had.

Sufism ran in Hashim's family. He, his father and grandfather practised piri-muridi. He took Sufism as an established belief. His Punjabi poetry reverberates with mysticism of high order and can be allegorically interpreted for Love Divine.

Hashim died in Ajnala, 1843 or 1823 and was buried in Tharpal village in Narowal District where every year Urs was held on or about 21st of Jeth (end May – early June).

In his poetic compositions his prosody is Punjabi though his vocabulary abounds in Hindi, Persian and Arabic words He has written the following books:

Qissa Shirin Farhad
Qissa Sohni Mahiwal
Qissa Sassi Punnun
Gyan Prakash
Dohre

References 

Great Sufi Poets of The Punjab by R. M. Chopra, (1999), Iran Society, Kolkata.

Punjabi-language poets
1735 births
1843 deaths
Punjabi people